Shaheed Bhulu Stadium (Bangla:শহীদ ভুলু স্টেডিয়াম) is the district stadium of  Noakhali, Bangladesh. The Stadium is situated near College Gate in Noakhali municipality. Stadium is used for national parade, professional and district level football and cricket leagues.  It has become a venue of first class and list A cricket since 2000. This is the 15th venue used for Bangladesh Premier League (BPL) matches.

Hosting National Sporting Event 
The venue was the zonal host of 3rd round of National Football Championship from June18–29 in 2003

Current Status 
This is as the home ground for NoFeL Sporting Club and Team BJMC, the football team which plays in the Bangladesh Football Premier League 2018–2019.

See also
Stadiums in Bangladesh
Tangail Stadium
List of football stadiums in Bangladesh
List of cricket grounds in Bangladesh

References

Football venues in Bangladesh
Cricket grounds in Bangladesh